Dalcera canescens is a moth in the family Dalceridae. It is found in Suriname, French Guiana, Brazil and Peru.

Adults are on wing in April, July, September and from November to January.

References

Dalceridae
Moths described in 1926
Moths of South America